Conway Township is a civil township of Livingston County in the U.S. state of Michigan. The population was 3,546 at the 2010 census, an increase of 814 from the 2000 census.

Communities

Geography

Demographics

2010 census
As of the 2010 census, there were 3,546 people, 1,199 households, and 968 families residing in the township. The racial makeup of the village was 96.4% White, 0.3% African American, 0.8% Native American, 0.8% Asian, 0.1% from other races, and 1.6% from two or more races. Hispanic or Latino of any race were 1.7% of the population.

There were 968 households, of which 38.0% had children under the age of 18 living with them, 66.2% were married couples living together, 8.5% had a female householder with no husband present, 6.0% had a male householder with no wife present, and 19.3% were non-families. 15.2% of all households were made up of individuals, and 5.5% had someone living alone who was 65 years of age or older. The average household size was 2.95 and the average family size was 3.28.

The median age in the township was 37 years. 28.9% of residents were under the age of 18; 7.4% were between the ages of 18 and 24; 27.1% were from 25 to 44; 28.3% were from 45 to 64; and 8.5% were 65 years of age or older. The gender makeup of the township was 52.1% male and 47.9% female.

The median income for a household in the township was $68,077, and the median income for a family $76,638. Males had a median income of $63,125 versus $40,469 for females. The per capita income for the township was $25,751. 8.5% of families and 10.9% of the population were below the poverty line, including 13.3% of those under 18 and 6.7% of those 65 or older.

2000 census
As of the 2000 census, there were 2,732 people, 887 households, and 748 families residing in the township. The racial makeup of the township was 95.97% White, 0.26% African American, 1.43% Native American, 0.15% Asian, 0.00% Pacific Islander, 0.55% from other races, and 1.65% from two or more races.  1.32% of the population were Hispanic or Latino of any race.

There were 887 households, out of which 45.7% had children under the age of 18 living with them, 75.3% were married couples living together, 6.2% had a female householder with no husband present, and 15.6% are non-families. 12.6% of all households were made up of individuals, and 4.2% had someone living alone who was 65 years of age or older.  The average household size was 3.08 and the average family size was 3.38.

The median age in the township was 35 years. 31.3% of residents were under the age of 18; 7.1% were between the ages of 18 and 24; 32.7% were from 25 to 44; 21.6% were from 45 to 64; and 7.4% were 65 years of age or older. The gender makeup of the township was 51.7% male and 48.3% female.

The median income for a household in the township was $64,306, and the median income for a family was $67,206. Males had a median income of $49,392 versus $27,813 for females. The per capita income for the township was $23,796.  2.3% of families and 4.1% of the population were below the poverty line,  including 6.1% of those under 18 and 6.6% of those 65 or older.

References

External links
Township of Conway Official Website

Townships in Livingston County, Michigan
Townships in Michigan